Mambulgoda Grama Niladhari Division is a Grama Niladhari Division of the Homagama Divisional Secretariat  of Colombo District  of Western Province, Sri Lanka .  It has Grama Niladhari Division Code 500A.

Mambulgoda is a surrounded by the Mattegoda East, Brahmanagama, Hiripitiya, Niyandagala and Kithulhena  Grama Niladhari Divisions.

Demographics

Ethnicity 

The Mambulgoda Grama Niladhari Division has a Sinhalese majority (97.5%) . In comparison, the Homagama Divisional Secretariat (which contains the Mambulgoda Grama Niladhari Division) has a Sinhalese majority (98.1%)

Religion 

The Mambulgoda Grama Niladhari Division has a Buddhist majority (95.7%) . In comparison, the Homagama Divisional Secretariat (which contains the Mambulgoda Grama Niladhari Division) has a Buddhist majority (96.2%)

Grama Niladhari Divisions of Homagama Divisional Secretariat

References